International Wrestling Association may refer to:
International Wrestling Association (Puerto Rico) (IWA), one of several major promotions based in Puerto Rico which was established by promoter Victor Quiñones in 1994. 
International Wrestling Association of Japan (IWA Japan), a Japanese-based promotion, founded by Victor Quiñones in 1994 as an offshoot of IWA Puerto Rico and successor of WI*NG. 
International Wrestling Association (1970s), a short-lived Cleveland-based promotion established by promoters Pedro Martinez and Eddie Einhorn in one of the earliest attempts to establish a national wrestling promotion during 1975. 
International Wrestling Association (Chicago), a defunct Chicago-based regional promotion established by promoter Fred Kohler during the early 1960s. 
International Wrestling Association (Montreal), a regional Montreal-based regional promotion established by promoter Johnny Rougeau during the 1960s and 1970s. The promotion would eventually be succeeded by Promotions Varoussac (International Wrestling) during the early 1970s.